Robert Hutchison is the name of:

Robert Hutchison of Carlowrie (1834–1894), Scottish landowner and photographer
Robert Hutchison, 1st Baron Hutchison of Montrose (1873–1950), Scottish soldier, politician and peer
Sir Robert Hutchison, 1st Baronet of Thurle (1871–1960), Scottish physician and writer
Robert Gemmell Hutchison (1855–1936), Scottish landscape artist

See also
Robert Hutchinson (disambiguation)
Bobby Hutcherson (1941–2016), jazz musician